Christopher Dark (born Alfred Francis DeLeo, April 21, 1920 – October 10, 1971) was an American actor. He graduated from Cornell University and did post graduate work at Columbia University.  He served as an army medic in the Philippines during WWII, and received honors. He began his career in theater in NY, and then moved to Hollywood in 1952.  He was a member of the Foreign Film Committee for SAG for most of his career.  As well as acting, he also wrote many scripts, including collaborations with Ida Lupino and Christopher Cary.

Biography

Dark was born in New York.

In 1954, Dark played in an episode of the TV series, The Lone Ranger, entitled Texas Draw. In 1955, Dark was cast in an episode of the NBC western anthology series, Frontier, hosted by Walter Coy. Dark guest starred on two episodes of the ABC religion anthology series, Crossroads, as Irving Green in "The Unholy Trio (1955) and as Frank Corletto in "Circus Priest" (1956).

In 1956, Dark appeared in two episodes of Science Fiction Theatre, S2E6 "Bullet Proof," and S2E9 "End of Tomorrow."

In 1957 and 1958, Dark guest starred in two episodes of David Janssen's crime drama, Richard Diamond, Private Detective, as the lead in "The Mickey Farmer Case" and then as Rudi Trekhala in "Widow's Walk". About this time, he also guest starred on John Bromfield's crime drama, U.S. Marshal. In 1957, he played Sgt. Al Zavala in four episodes of the syndicated crime drama, Code 3, with Richard Travis in the lead role of assistant Sheriff Rodger Barnett. He also guest-starred a number of times on the CBS situation comedy Mr. Adams and Eve during its two-season run in 1957–1958.

In 1958, Dark appeared as Don Ramon in "Decoy" on the ABC/Warner Brothers western series, Colt .45, starring Wayde Preston. That same year, Dark played the main villain, William Swanson, in the episode "The Young Gun" in Robert Culp's western series, Trackdown.

In 1959, Dark guest starred in the first episode of NBC's Bonanza in "A Rose for Lotta". Besides the pilot, he would also guest star in other three episodes of the western series: "The Fear Merchants" (1960), "Calamity Over the Comstock" (1963) and "Showdown at Tahoe" (1967).

Dark appeared in 1959 as Juan Carlos Morita in the episode "Death of a Gunfighter" on CBS' "Have Gun Will Travel" and as Trevor Jackson in the episode "Reunion" of CBS's The Texan, starring Rory Calhoun; his fellow co-stars were Bethel Leslie and Robert F. Simon. That same year, he was cast as Henri Gaspard in "Double Fee" of Steve McQueen's CBS western series, Wanted: Dead or Alive.

In 1960, Dark was cast with Richard Rust in the episode "An Hour to Kill" of the half-hour syndicated crime drama, The Brothers Brannagan, and he played a teacher falsely accused of murder in the Peter Gunn episode "Death Watch". Another 1960 role was that of Dante in "Talent for Danger" on the ABC adventure series, The Islanders, set in the South Pacific.

In 1960, he was cast as Miguel Avarado in the episode "Bandido" of the syndicated western series, Pony Express, starring Grant Sullivan. His fellow guest stars in the segment were Douglas Kennedy and Robert Ivers.

In 1962 Dark appeared as Walt Gleason on The Virginian in the episode titled "The Accomplice." 
and in 1963 as Benny Caboose in the episode entitled "Brother Thaddeus"

Dark played the role of Pike in the three-part 1964 episode, "The Tenderfoot", of NBC's Disney's The Wonderful World of Color.

Dark also appeared in 1965 on the fourth season of Combat! as a German agent in the episode "9 Place Vendee".

In 1970 Dark appeared as Mort in the TV western "The Men From Shiloh" (the rebranded name of The Virginian) in the episode titled "Jenny."

Personal life
Dark died from a heart attack on October 10, 1971. Dark was interred in Holy Cross Cemetery, Culver City, California.

Filmography

References

External links

 
 

1920 births
1971 deaths
20th-century American male actors
American male film actors
American male television actors
Male Western (genre) film actors
Male actors from New York City
People from the Bronx
Western (genre) television actors